Oceanography and Marine Biology: An Annual Review is an annual review of oceanography and marine biology that has been published since 1963. It was originally edited by Harold Barnes. It was originally published by Aberdeen University Press and Allen & Unwin but is now published by CRC Press, part of Taylor & Francis. The 55th volume was published in 2017.

References

University of Aberdeen
Monographic series
Marine biology
Oceanography
Publications established in 1963
Biology journals
Taylor & Francis academic journals
CRC Press books